The Villa Bílek is a house designed by the Czech sculptor and architect František Bílek in 1911. The villa is located in Hradčany neighbourhood of Prague, Czech Republic, several minutes walk from Hradčanská metro station or Prague Castle. It was designed originally for Bílek himself as his residence and studio.

Located on site of former city walls (see preserved Písek Gate nearby) the villa has an unusual shape resembling trace of a scythe in a field. The brickwork masonry is articulated by pillars in form of corn sheaves which evoke Egyptian architecture. Through this building Bílek, who was a deeply religious artist, tried to express his view on substance of life.

Villa Bílek has been maintained by Gallery of the Capital City of Prague since 1963. It houses a public exposition that introduces many works by Bílek, as well as original interior fittings and furniture collection which was made according to his design.

References

External links 
 Official Website of the Villa Bílek

Tourist attractions in Prague
Art Nouveau architecture in Prague
Art Nouveau houses
Houses in the Czech Republic
Buildings and structures in Prague
Houses completed in 1911
1911 establishments in Austria-Hungary